Leonardo Gabriel Rolón (born 19 January 1995) is an Argentine footballer who plays as a right winger or right full back for Kelantan.

Club career
Rolón played youth football and debuted professionally with Vélez Sarsfield in 2013, starting as right back in a 1–1 draw with All Boys. He was an unused substitute in his team's victory over Arsenal de Sarandí in the 2013 Supercopa Argentina.

Rolón scored his first goal with Vélez in a 4–1 victory over Rosario Central for the 2014 Final, in which he started as right winger. Upon Agustín Allione's departure from the club, Rolón saw more first team action as the team's right winger, playing 16 matches in the 2014 Argentine Primera División. In this tournament he also scored an olympic goal in the third fixture's 4–0 win over Independiente.

In July 2015, Rolón was sanctioned by Vélez with one week of salary after not showing to play for the reserve's team against Rosario Central. He was subsequently left out of the first team squad and loaned to Emelec in the Ecuadorian Serie A.

International career
In 2015, Rolón was selected to play for the Argentina national under-20 football team in the South American Youth Championship. He played six games (all as a starter) and scored once, helping his team to obtain the championship.

Rolón also started in Argentina's three games in the 2015 FIFA U-20 World Cup.

Personal life
Leonardo's twin brother Maxi was also a professional footballer, who was his teammate for Arsenal de Sarandí and the Argentina under-20 team. Maxi and their 30-year-old brother Ariel died in a car crash in Casilda, Santa Fe Province on 14 May 2022.

Honours
Vélez Sarsfield
Supercopa Argentina: 2013

Argentina U-20
South American Youth Football Championship: 2015

References

External links
 Profile at Vélez Sarsfield's official website 
  
 

Living people
1995 births
Argentine twins
Twin sportspeople
Footballers from Rosario, Santa Fe
Argentine footballers
Argentine expatriate footballers
Argentine Primera División players
Club Atlético Vélez Sarsfield footballers
C.S. Emelec footballers
Ecuadorian Serie A players
Arsenal de Sarandí footballers
Deportes Iquique footballers
Audax Italiano footballers
Chilean Primera División players
Quilmes Atlético Club footballers
Club Atlético Mitre footballers
Kelantan F.C. players
Argentina under-20 international footballers
2015 South American Youth Football Championship players
Expatriate footballers in Chile
Expatriate footballers in Ecuador
Expatriate footballers in Mexico
Argentine expatriate sportspeople in Chile
Argentine expatriate sportspeople in Ecuador
Argentine expatriate sportspeople in Mexico
Association football defenders
Association football midfielders